Ahmed Hussein is an Egyptian swimmer. It may also refer to

Ahmed Hussein (1905–1982), Egyptian politician
Ahmed Hussen (born 1976), a Canadian politician
Ahmed Hussain (minister) (1863–1950), Indian politician and businessman
Ahmed Houssein, Djiboutian football manager
Ahmed Hussein Adan (born 1977), Iraqi football player
Ahmed Hussain A. Kazi (1920–2007), Pakistani civil servant
Ahmed Hussain Macan Markar (1911–15 July 1985), Sri Lankan politician
Ahmed Hussain Shah, Pakistani politician
Ahmed Hussein-Suale (1987–2019), Ghanaian journalist

See also